Neshaminy Falls station is a station along the SEPTA West Trenton Line to Ewing, New Jersey. It is located at Bristol Road & Linden Street in Bensalem Township, Pennsylvania. The station has off-street parking and a handicapped-accessible platform.  In FY 2013, Neshaminy Falls station had a weekday average of 276 boardings and 259 alightings.

Neshaminy Falls station was originally built in 1888 by the Philadelphia & Reading Railroad for both passenger and freight service and was razed in March 1970. Neshaminy Falls station is also near CSX's Trenton Subdivision that leads to the Fox Chase Line between Ryers and  Cheltenham stations.

Station layout
Neshaminy Falls has two low-level side platforms with a mini high-level platform.

Gallery

References

External links

SEPTA - Neshaminy Falls Station
Old Neshaminy Falls Station image (Existing RR Stations in Bucks County, Pennsylvania)
March 2000 Photos by Bob Wright (NYC Subways.org)

SEPTA Regional Rail stations
Former Reading Company stations
Railway stations in Bucks County, Pennsylvania
Railway stations in the United States opened in 1889